Ganlin is a town in Shengzhou, Zhejiang province, China. , it has two neighborhoods and 35 villages under its administration: 
Neighborhoods
Ganlin
Boji
Villages
Ganlin Village
Yashen Village
Yinjia Village
Huangshengtang Village
Jiaozhen Village
Dongwang Village
Huangjianban Village
Shanggao Village
Liu'an Village
Bainidun Village
Jiangtian Village
Jiaxiuban Village
Zha Village
Matang Village
Dawangmiao Village
Shangluxi Village
Kong Village
Cangyan Village
Dianqian Village
Shijia'ao Village
Chang'an Village
Shidaodi Village
Haoling Village
Caiwang Village
Luohu Village
Louzhuang Village
Shadi Village
Shangye Village
Meijia Village
Jinxiu Village
Fenghuangke Village
Shanbei Village
Yangqiao Village
Dongxi Village
Xiaohuangshan Village

See also 
 List of township-level divisions of Zhejiang

References 

Township-level divisions of Zhejiang
Shengzhou